Isaac Asimov Presents The Great SF Stories 23 (1961) is an American collection of science fiction short stories, the twenty-third volume of  Isaac Asimov Presents The Great SF Stories,  a series of short story collections, edited by Isaac Asimov and Martin H. Greenberg, which attempts to list the great science fiction stories from the Golden Age of Science Fiction. They date the Golden Age as beginning in 1939 and lasting until 1963. This volume was originally published by DAW books in July 1991.

Stories 
 "The Highest Treason" by Randall Garrett
 "Hothouse" by Brian W. Aldiss
 "Hiding Place" by Poul Anderson
 "What is This Thing Called Love?" by Isaac Asimov
 "A Prize for Edie" by J. F. Bone
 "The Ship Who Sang" by Anne McCaffrey
 "Death and the Senator" by Arthur C. Clarke
 "The Quaker Cannon" by Frederik Pohl and Cyril M. Kornbluth
 "The Moon Moth" by Jack Vance
 "A Planet Named Shayol" by Cordwainer Smith
 "Rainbird" by R. A. Lafferty
 "Wall of Crystal, Eye of Night" by Algis Budrys
 "Remember the Alamo!" by T. R. Fehrenbach

Notes

23
1991 anthologies
DAW Books books
Martin H. Greenberg anthologies
1961 short stories